Crypsiptya nereidalis is a moth in the family Crambidae. It was described by Julius Lederer in 1863. It is found on the Moluccas and the Bismarck Archipelago.

References

Moths described in 1863
Pyraustinae